Radoslav Peković (born 23 March 1994) is a Serbian professional basketball player for Best Balıkesir of the Turkish Basketball First League.

Career
Peković signed his first professional contract with Crvena zvezda in August 2012 after spending 18 months in Geoplin Slovan's youth program. After playing two years at loan with FMP, in September 2015, he signed with Tamiš.

In October 2017, Peković signed with Russian club Spartak Saint Petersburg.

On August 18, 2019, he has signed with  Dzūkija Alytus.

On September 8, 2021, he has signed with Gladiators Trier of the ProA.

On June 23, 2022, he has signed with Best Balıkesir of the Turkish Basketball First League.

References

External links
 Profile at eurobasket.com
 Profile at fiba.com

1994 births
Living people
Basketball League of Serbia players
Basketball players from Novi Sad
BC Spartak Saint Petersburg players
Centers (basketball)
KK Crvena zvezda youth players
KK FMP players
KK Tamiš players
Serbian expatriate basketball people in Slovenia
Serbian expatriate basketball people in Lithuania
Serbian expatriate basketball people in North Macedonia
Serbian expatriate basketball people in Russia
Serbian men's basketball players